Gol Tappeh-ye Malali (also Romanized as Gol Tappeh-ye Malālī; also known as Gol Tappeh-ye Mollā’ī) is a village in Fuladlui Shomali Rural District, Hir District, Ardabil County, Ardabil Province, Iran. At the 2006 census, its population was 123, in 27 families.

References 

Towns and villages in Ardabil County